Tikla, or Tikula, is an archeological site and ancient rock shelter in Madhya Pradesh, India, known for its petroglyphs.

Probably the earliest known Indian depiction of the Mathuran known as the Vrishni heroes, is a rock painting found at Tikla. This rock painting is dated to the 3rd-2nd century BCE, based on the paleography of the Brahmi inscription accompanying it. The deities are depicted wearing a dhoti with a peculiar headdress, and are shown holding their attributes: a plow and a sort of mace for Balarama, and a mace and a wheel for Vāsudeva. A third smaller character is added, forming what can be called a Vrishni trio, in the person of a female, thought to be the Goddess Ekanamsha, who seems to hold a Chatra royal umbrella. These depictions belong to "Period IV" of the rock shelter, and are accompanied by contemporaneous images of elephant riders, horse riders and flowers.

Tikla has a famous carved petroglyph representing a maze. It is the earliest known maze design in India, is dated to 250 BCE, and it is thought that the design was introduced with the campaigns of Alexander the Great.

References

Archaeological sites in Madhya Pradesh
Gwalior district